Atlantis: Hymns for Disco is the third studio album by hip-hop artist k-os. It was released in Canada on October 10, 2006, and debuted at number 2 in music sales. The album was released worldwide on February 20, 2007. In the US, it reached number 152 on the Billboard 200 and number 5 on the Heatseekers.

Track listing 
 "ELEctrik HeaT - the seekwiLL" – 3:38
 "The Rain" – 3:51
 "FlyPaper" – 4:10
 "Equalizer" – 3:08
 "Sunday Morning" – 3:47
 "Mirror in the Sky" – 3:21
 "Born to Run" – 4:48 (includes an acoustic recording after the track)
 "Valhalla" (ft. Sam Roberts and Kevin Drew) – 4:16
 "CatDieseL" – 3:44
 "black Ice - Hymn for Disco" – 5:05
 "Chocolate Chewing Gun (Excerpt)" (Hidden track)
 "AquaCityBoy" – 2:41
 "Highway 7" – 4:07
 "Ballad of NoaH" (ft. Ian Kamau and Buck 65) – 8:59
 "Chocolate Chewing Gun" (Hidden track)
 US Edition
  "Funky Country" – 4:33

Singles 
 ELEctrik HeaT - the seekwiLL
 Sunday Morning
 FlyPaper
 Born to Run
 Equalizer

Certifications

Charts

References

2006 albums
K-os albums
EMI Records albums
Virgin Records albums
Albums recorded at Armoury Studios
Albums recorded at Hipposonic Studios
Albums recorded at The Warehouse Studio